Khushab Tehsil , is an administrative subdivision (tehsil) Khushab District in the Punjab province of Pakistan.

History
Khushab Tehsil was an agricultural region with forests during the Indus Valley civilization. The Vedic period is characterized by Indo-Aryan culture that invaded from Central Asia and settled in Punjab region. The Kambojas, Daradas, Kaikayas, Madras, Pauravas, Yaudheyas, Malavas, Saindhavas and Kurus invaded, settled and ruled ancient Punjab region. After overrunning the Achaemenid Empire in 331 BCE, Alexander marched into present-day Punjab region with an army of 50,000. The Khushab was ruled by Maurya Empire, Indo-Greek kingdom, Kushan Empire, Gupta Empire, White Huns, Kushano-Hephthalites and the Turk and Hindu Shahi kingdoms.

In 997 CE, Sultan Mahmud Ghaznavi, took over the Ghaznavid dynasty empire established by his father, Sultan Sebuktegin. In 1005 he conquered the Shahis in Kabul in 1005, and followed it by the conquests of Punjab region. The Delhi Sultanate and later Mughal Empire ruled the region. The Punjab region became predominantly Muslim due to missionary Sufi saints whose dargahs dot the landscape of Punjab region.

After the decline of the Mughal Empire, the Sikh Empire invaded and occupied Khushab Tehsil. The Muslims faced restrictions during the Sikh rule. During the period of British rule,  Khushab district increased in population and importance. The population according to the 1901 census was 161,885 a rise of over 10,000 since 1891.

The predominantly Muslim population supported Muslim League and Pakistan Movement.  After the independence of Pakistan in 1947, the minority Hindus and Sikhs migrated to India while the Muslim refugees from India settled in the Khushab Tehsil.

Administration
Khushab tehsil is subdivided into 32 Union Councils:

References

Tehsils of Punjab, Pakistan
Indus Valley civilisation sites